Josh Blake (born 18 September 1998) is an English cricketer who plays for Surrey County Cricket Club. He is a left handed batsman and wicket-keeper.

Career
Blake signed a professional contract with Surrey in 2022. He has been coaching at the Surrey Cricket Foundation since 2018 and playing Second XI cricket for Surrey since 2021. Blake played age group cricket with Surrey from under-9s through to under-15s. He has also played for Sutton Cricket Club.

Blake made List A debut on 2 August 2022 in the Royal London One-Day Cup against Leicestershire at Guilford.

References

External links

Living people
1998 births
Surrey cricketers
English cricketers
Cricketers from Croydon
People educated at Trinity School of John Whitgift